Yangxin railway station is a railway station in  Yangxin County, Huangshi, Hubei, China. It is an intermediate stop on the Dezhou–Dajiawa railway and the Wuhan–Jiujiang passenger railway.

History

On 21 September 2017, the Wuhan–Jiujiang passenger railway opened and faster services began calling at the station.

References 

Railway stations in Hubei